Robert Edward Casale Jr. (born Robert Edward Pizzute Jr.; July 14, 1952 – February 17, 2014), or "Bob 2", was an American musician, composer and record producer. He came to prominence in the late 1970s as the keyboardist and rhythm guitarist of the new wave band Devo, which released a Top 20 hit in 1980 with the single "Whip It". The band has maintained a cult following throughout its existence. He was the younger brother of their co-founder and bass guitarist Gerald Casale.

Early years
Robert Edward Pizzute Jr. was born on July 14, 1952, in Kent, Ohio. He was born with the last name Pizzute because his father had legally changed his name from Robert Edward Casale to that of his foster parents. In the same year as Bob's birth, his father changed his name back to his birth name. Casale graduated from Theodore Roosevelt High School in 1970 and originally trained as a radiographer.

Career

Devo
In early 1970, Bob Lewis and Gerald Casale formed the idea of the "devolution" of the human race after Casale's friend Jeffrey Miller was killed by Ohio National Guardsmen during the Kent State shootings. Casale joined Devo in 1973, after being recruited by his brother Gerald. After the band underwent a few line-up changes, Bob Casale became part of the most popular five-piece incarnation, which consisted of two sets of brothers, the Mothersbaughs (Mark and Bob) and the Casales (Gerald and Bob), along with drummer Alan Myers. Casale later claimed that they formed the band because "it was a more immediate way of self-expression that required less money and no outside permission."

Following the commercial failure of their sixth studio album Shout, Warner Bros. dropped Devo. Shortly after, claiming to feel creatively unfulfilled, Alan Myers left the band, causing the remaining band members to abandon the plans for a Shout video LP, as well as a tour. In the interim, Casale began a career as an audio engineer. In 1987, Devo reformed with new drummer David Kendrick. The band stopped performing in 1991, but reformed as a musical act in 1995. Around this time, members of Devo appeared in the film The Spirit of '76 but without Bob Mothersbaugh.

In Devo concerts, Casale played the lead and rhythm guitar and keyboards while also working with MIDI sampling. He also sang backing vocals, both on albums and at live shows.

Other work
As Devo's mainstream popularity waned during the mid-1980s and its various members began working on side projects, Casale transitioned to audio engineering and record production. He engineered and mixed Mark Mothersbaugh's debut solo studio album Muzik for Insomniaks in 1985, which was later expanded and released as two CDs in 1988. In 1986, Casale produced and engineered Martini Ranch's debut EP "How Can the Labouring Man Find Time for Self-Culture?" which also featured Alan Myers on percussion and Mark Mothersbaugh on keyboards and in the late summer of 1986 he engineered the debut solo studio album for the Police's guitarist Andy Summers, recorded at Devo Studios in California. XYZ, featuring songs written and sung by Summers, was then released in 1987.

In 1989, Bob Casale and other members of Devo were involved in the project Visiting Kids, releasing a self-titled EP on the New Rose label in 1990. The band featured Mark Mothersbaugh's then-wife Nancye Ferguson, as well as David Kendrick, Bob Mothersbaugh and Bob's daughter Alex Mothersbaugh. Their record was produced by Bob Casale and Mark Mothersbaugh and Mark also co-wrote some of the songs. Visiting Kids appeared on the soundtrack to the film Rockula (1990), as well as on the Late Show with David Letterman. A promotional video was filmed for the song "Trilobites".

Casale later became a part of the musical production group Mutato Muzika with other members of Devo.

As audio engineering and record production opportunities expanded for Casale and bandmate Mark Mothersbaugh, Casale began working for television and movies, including Four Rooms, Happy Gilmore, Rushmore, The Royal Tenenbaums and Rugrats Go Wild.

Death
On February 17, 2014, Casale died at the age of 61, in Los Angeles, California, due to heart failure. According to his brother Gerald, he went to the emergency room because he was coughing up blood. He was scheduled for tests and his family went home. During the tests, Casale became "agitated" and was given a sedative, after which his blood pressure plunged. He was given epinephrine. When his heart stopped, the medical staff was unable to get it started again.

He is survived by his brother Gerald and two children, Alex and Samantha.

Devo toured the U.S. and Canada in June and July 2014, playing ten dates consisting of their "experimental music" composed and recorded from 1974 to 1978. Planned as a 40th anniversary tour, this outing was billed as the "Hardcore Devo" tour. Partial proceeds for the ten shows went to support Casale's family.

Casale was cremated. His remains were placed in a 3D-printed urn shaped like a Devo energy dome.

Soundtracks

Television

Film

Discography

Devo

References

External links
 
 
 

1952 births
2014 deaths
21st-century American composers
American audio engineers
American male composers
American multi-instrumentalists
American television composers
American rock guitarists
American male guitarists
American rock keyboardists
American new wave musicians
American SubGenii
American synth-pop musicians
American people of Italian descent
Guitarists from Ohio
Record producers from Ohio
Devo members
People from Kent, Ohio
20th-century American composers
20th-century American male musicians
20th-century American guitarists
American post-punk musicians